John Woodworth (November 12, 1768, Schodack – June 1, 1858, Albany, New York) was an American lawyer and member of the Woodworth political family.

Early life and education
Woodworth was born in 1768, the son of future New York State Senator Robert Woodworth, and Rachel Fitch, daughter of Abel Fitch. Woodworth studied law with John Lansing, Jr. at Yale College, graduating in 1788, and was admitted to the bar in 1791.

Personal life
He married Catharine Westerlo (1778–1846, sister of Rensselaer Westerlo, and half-sister of Stephen Van Rensselaer III).

Public service
He commenced practice in Troy, New York, and was appointed Loan Commissioner in 1792, Surrogate of Rensselaer County from 1793 to 1804. He was a presidential elector in 1800, voting for Thomas Jefferson and Aaron Burr. In 1811, Woodworth was appointed a commissioner to revise the state laws. Woodworth was a Regent of the University of the State of New York.

Woodworth was a member from Renssealaer County of the New York State Assembly in 1803. During this session, he was the Democratic-Republican caucus nominee for the election of a U.S. Senator from New York, but was narrowly defeated by Theodorus Bailey who was supported by a faction of his party who combined with the Federalists.

Woodworth was a member of the New York State Senate from 1804 to 1807, and at the same time was New York State Attorney General from 1804 to 1808. He was a justice of the New York State Supreme Court from 1819 to 1828. He was one of the last members of the Council of Revision which was abolished by the New York State Constitutional Convention of 1821.

Literary works
Laws of New York, with Notes (with William P. Van Ness, 2 vols., Albany, 1813)
Reminiscences of Troy from its Settlement in 1790 till 1807 (Albany, 1855)

References

Short bio at Court History
Political Graveyard
Van Rensselaer genealogy and history

1768 births
1858 deaths
New York (state) state senators
Members of the New York State Assembly
New York State Attorneys General
New York Supreme Court Justices
Regents of the University of the State of New York
John
Yale College alumni
People from Schodack, New York
1800 United States presidential electors
Politicians from Troy, New York